Newbald is a civil parish in the East Riding of Yorkshire, England.

The civil parish is formed by the village of North Newbald and the hamlet of South Newbald.

According to the 2011 UK census, Newbald parish had a population of 1,115, an increase on the 2001 UK census figure of 989.

Governance
Newbald was in the Haltemprice and Howden  parliamentary constituency until the 2010 general election when it was transferred to the constituency of Beverley and Holderness.

References

External links

Civil parishes in the East Riding of Yorkshire